Four Epigraphs after Escher (German: 4 Epigraphe nach Escher), Op. 35, is a chamber music composition by Graham Waterhouse, written in 1993 for viola, heckelphone and piano. Its four movements refer to graphic artworks by M. C. Escher. It was premiered in  Munich in 1995, and the U.S. premiere was given in 1998. It was published by Hofmeister in 1998.

History 

Waterhouse was inspired by graphic artworks by M. C. Escher to write in 1993 Four Epigraphs after Escher in four movements, each named for a piece of graphic art. He scored it as a piano trio with viola and heckelphone. It is one of few compositions for a solo heckelphone, a kind of oboe in low register. Paul Hindemith had written a Trio, Op. 47, for the same ensemble in 1928. The work was published by Friedrich Hofmeister Musikverlag in Leipzig in 1998.

The composition is structured in four movements:
 Die Gottesanbeterin (Praying mantis)
 Möbiusband II (Möbius strip)
 Reiter (Rider)
 Reptilien (Reptiles)

The first movement was inspired by a graphic showing an oversized mantis in a church, on a stone monument to a bishop on his tomb. Escher dealt with the phenomenon of the Möbius strip several times; the music relates to Möbius II, with ants crawling over the strip. The third movement alludes to a print with riders in two directions and two colour shades, partly complementing each other. The final movement is based on Escher's 1934 print Reptiles.

Performances 
Four Epigraphs after Escher was premiered in  Munich in 1995, and the U.S. premiere was played at the 1998 conference of the International Double Reed Society in Tempe, Arizona. In a concert on 6 June of music by Waterhouse, which contained also two world premieres, one more U.S. premiere and a reprise of Mouvements d'Harmonie, the piece was played by Gerald Corey, Heckelphone, violist Peter Rosato and the composer as the pianist.

References

External links 
  of Graham Waterhouse
 Graham Waterhouse (1962): Four Epigraphs after Escher, op. 35, for Viola, Heckelphon and Klavier at Musik4Viola

Chamber music by Graham Waterhouse
Contemporary classical compositions
Compositions for piano trio
1993 compositions
Music based on art
M. C. Escher